Berea was an unincorporated community in Eureka Township, Adair County, Iowa, United States.

History

Berea was founded along the banks of the Middle Nodaway River; it was named after the Ancient Greek city of Berea. The community was founded by Ned Brown and Alexander Broadfoot, who were early  settlers, and its peak population was around 100 residents. 

A post office called Berea was established in 1894, and remained in operation until 1908. In 1905, the community was reported to have a population of 40, with a general store, a pharmacist, a creamery, a blacksmith and a wagonmaker. The Berea Store was built in June 1909, replacing an earlier store which had been destroyed by fire.

In 1915, Berea was described as a village, with the Berea Horse Company being a noted business, owned by brothers Isaac Brown and A.R. Brown. At that time, Berea had a town band which performed at community events. Around that time, Berea's population was estimated at 50 residents.

The Berea Gospel Hall was built in 1929. 

The Rock Island Railroad passed through nearby Anita and Adair, and it was for this reason that Berea began to decline. A school still operated at Berea in the 1930s, but most other services had closed by this time. In 1936, the Berea School closed due to lack of pupils, and by the 1940s, the community was called a "ghost village". By that time, Berea had only a general store, the closed school, and the Berea Gospel Hall.

The Berea Store was purchased by the Arnold family in 1950. 

Berea still appeared on state maps as late as 1960.

References

Unincorporated communities in Adair County, Iowa
Unincorporated communities in Iowa